David Hall (birth unknown), is a former professional rugby league footballer who played in the 1970s and 1980s.

Playing career

International honours
Dave Hall won caps for Great Britain while at Hull Kingston Rovers in 1984 against France (2 matches).

Challenge Cup Final appearances
Dave Hall played  in Hull Kingston Rovers' 10-5 victory over Hull F.C. in the 1979–80 Challenge Cup Final during the 1979–80 season at Wembley Stadium, London on Saturday 3 May 1980, in front of a crowd of 95,000, and played  in the 9-18 defeat by Widnes in the 1980–81 Challenge Cup Final during the 1980–81 season at Wembley Stadium, London on Saturday 2 May 1981, in front of a crowd of 92,496.

County Cup Final appearances
Dave Hall played  in Hull Kingston Rovers' 7-8 defeat by Leeds in the 1980–81 Yorkshire County Cup Final during the 1979–80 season at Fartown Ground, Huddersfield on Saturday 8 November 1980, and played  (replaced by interchange/substitute Steve Hartley) in the 12-29 defeat by Hull F.C. in the 1984–85 Yorkshire County Cup Final during the 1984–85 season at Boothferry Park, Kingston upon Hull on Saturday 27 October 1984.

BBC2 Floodlit Trophy Final appearances
Dave Hall played , and scored 4-goals in Hull Kingston Rovers' 26-11 victory over St. Helens in the 1977 BBC2 Floodlit Trophy Final during the 1977-78 season at Craven Park, Hull on Tuesday 13 December 1977, and played  in the 3-13 defeat by Hull F.C. in the 1979 BBC2 Floodlit Trophy Final during the 1979–80 season at The Boulevard, Hull on Tuesday 18 December 1979. The record for the most goals in a BBC2 Floodlit Trophy Final is 4-goals, and is jointly held by; Ron Willett, Kel Coslett, and Dave Hall.

John Player Trophy Final appearances
Dave Hall played  in Hull Kingston Rovers' 4-12 defeat by Hull F.C. in the 1981–82 John Player Trophy Final during the 1981–82 season at Headingley Rugby Stadium, Leeds on Saturday 23 January 1982.

Testimonial match
Dave Hall's Testimonial match at Hull Kingston Rovers took place in 1981.

Genealogical information
Dave Hall is the father of the rugby league footballer; Craig Hall.

References

External links
!Great Britain Statistics at englandrl.co.uk (statistics currently missing due to not having appeared for both Great Britain, and England)

Living people
English rugby league players
Great Britain national rugby league team players
Hull Kingston Rovers players
Place of birth missing (living people)
Rugby league five-eighths
Rugby league centres
Rugby league fullbacks
Rugby league locks
Wakefield Trinity players
Year of birth missing (living people)